Waingawa railway station is a station on the Wairarapa Line in the Masterton district of New Zealand's North Island. It served passenger trains until 1992 and now only handles freight (private sidings and special consignments).

History 
It was a private siding that had for a long time been known as Donald's Siding, and was used by the Wellington Meat Export Company to load livestock for transport to their abattoir at Ngahauranga.

In 1921 this became the location of a new station called Waingawa, complete with signalling apparatus, and the name Taratahi ceased to be used.

Though a co-operative freezing works were established at Waingawa in 1897, the brisk traffic in livestock from Waingawa to Wellington continued, at least until the opening of the Waingawa Freezing Works. In 1966 a siding was laid from the Waingawa yard to the then-new Masterton sale yards. The sale yards are still extant today but their siding has long since been removed.

Several industrial neighbours have come and gone in the vicinity of Waingawa station. In 1911, the Waingawa Freezing Works were opened by the Wellington Farmers' Meat Company and lasted until 9 November 1989 when, in the hands of AFFCO, the works were closed as part of an industry rationalisation.  Japanese forestry products company Juken Nissho (now Juken New Zealand) opened a mill just north of the station in February 1992, which continues to transport goods by rail using its own private siding.

Today 
Since the closure of the freezing works, forestry related businesses and trucking companies have largely supplanted the livestock trade at Waingawa, with the JNL mill now the largest rail customer on site.  This may change in the future, as several projects are under consideration that may involve the use of rail for the transport of product out of the Wairarapa, including:
 Wairarapa log freight rail project
 Waingawa Industrial Park
 Bulk milk transfer from Waingawa to Hawera via the Manawatu Gorge

In February 2009 funding from the National Land Transport Programme for the log freight project was approved by the NZ Transport Agency. Log traffic started in March 2012 and typically moves around 300 tonnes of logs per day.

The former Waingawa station building was rescued from demolition by the Wairarapa Railway Restoration Society in 1991 and relocated to the Carterton station precinct where it may be viewed by visitors to the museum there.

The only sign at Waingawa that passenger trains used to stop there is the old station platform which can still be seen from Waingawa Road.  There is little prospect of a passenger station being re-established here, as Waingawa is officially considered to be part of the "Solway/Masterton rail station catchment".

Gallery

Footnotes

External links 
 
 

Rail transport in Wellington
Railway stations in New Zealand
Railway stations opened in 1921
Buildings and structures in the Wairarapa